Dead Men Tell is a 1941 American mystery film starring Sidney Toler, who played Charlie Chan in 22 feature films, beginning with Charlie Chan in Honolulu (1938), and ending with The Trap (1946). The first 11 Charlie Chan films were produced by 20th Century Fox Studios, thereafter sold to Monogram Pictures.

The interiors for Dead Men Tell were filmed in 1941 at Fox Studios in Hollywood. Exterior shots were filmed on the 20th Century Fox backlot, which is now Century City.

Plot
Charlie Chan is engaged by an heir to solve a mystery on a boat. Miss Nodbury seeks a pirate treasure on Cocos Island, and her ship has recently hosted a museum of pirate lore. For safety, she has split her map into four pieces, which she gave to some of the passengers whom she has invited, but tells no one who they are. When she is given a fright and succumbs to her heart disease, Chan must clear up the mystery while the ship is still at the dock.

Cast
 Sidney Toler as Charlie Chan
 Sen Yung as Jimmy Chan
 Sheila Ryan as Kate Ransome
 Robert Weldon as Steve Daniels
 Don Douglas as Jed Thomasson
 Katharine Aldridge as Laura Thursday
 Paul McGrath as Charles Thursday / Mr. Parks
 George Reeves as Bill Lydig
 Ethel Griffies as Miss Patience Nodbury
 Lenita Lane as Dr. Anne Bonney
 Milton Parsons as Gene La Farge, patient of Dr. Bonney

References

External links
 
 
 
 

1941 films
American black-and-white films
American crime drama films
American detective films
1941 crime drama films
Charlie Chan films
20th Century Fox films
Films directed by Harry Lachman
1941 mystery films
American mystery films
1940s English-language films
1940s American films